Megan Donnelly (born May 11, 1964) is an American former field hockey player who competed in the 1988 Summer Olympics.
She won the silver medal at the Pan American Games in Indianapolis.

College
In 1986, while at Massachusetts , Donnelly won the Honda Award (now the Honda Sports Award) as the nation's best field hockey player.

References

External links
 

1964 births
Living people
American female field hockey players
Olympic field hockey players of the United States
Field hockey players at the 1988 Summer Olympics
People from Winchester, Massachusetts
Field hockey players at the 1987 Pan American Games
Medalists at the 1987 Pan American Games
Pan American Games silver medalists for the United States
Pan American Games medalists in field hockey
Sportspeople from Middlesex County, Massachusetts
UMass Minutewomen field hockey players